Sangchu or sang-chu may refer to:
Xiahe County, a county in Gansu, China
Sanju Pass, a mountain pass in Xinjiang, China 
 (born 1982), South Korean singer, member of Mighty Mouth
Ri Sang-chu, North Korean politician returned to the Supreme People's Assembly in the 2003 North Korean parliamentary election
Sang-chu, a minor character in the 2014 South Korean television series Gunman in Joseon